The 1st Utah Territorial Legislature was convened on September 22, 1851, and ended on March 6, 1852.

Sessions

 General Session: September 22, 1851 - February 18, 1852
 Special Session: February 19, 1852 - March 6, 1852

Members

See also
 List of Utah state legislatures

References

01
1851 establishments in Utah Territory